The Uganda Film Festival Award for Best Actress is an award presented annually by Uganda Communications Commission (UCC) at the Uganda Film Film Festival. It is given in honor of a female actor (actress) who has exhibited outstanding acting while working in the film industry in Uganda. The award was introduced in 2014.

Winners and nominees
The table shows the winners and nominees for the Best Actor in a Feature Film award. In 2015, two 
actresses Farida Kutesa and Nisha Kalema co-won the award, the only time the award was shared by two contenders.

Multiple wins and nominations
The following individuals have won multiple Best Best Actress in a Feature film:

The following actresses have received two or more Best Actress nominations

References

Ugandan film awards
Awards for actresses